Kandra Radha Kanta Kundu Mahavidyalaya, established in 2001 by social worker Amar Chand Kundu by the name of his father Radhakanta Kundu. It is a general degree college in Kandra, Purba Bardhaman district. It offers undergraduate courses in arts. It is affiliated to  University of Burdwan.

Departments

Arts

See also

References

External links
Kandra Radha Kanta Kundu Mahavidyalaya

Universities and colleges in Purba Bardhaman district
Colleges affiliated to University of Burdwan
Educational institutions established in 2001
2001 establishments in West Bengal